The Singapore Amateur Radio Transmitting Society (SARTS) is a non-profit organization for amateur radio enthusiasts in Singapore.  The organization's primary mission is to popularize and promote amateur radio in Singapore.  SARTS sponsors amateur radio operating awards and operates special event stations on a regular basis.  One membership benefit of the organization is a QSL bureau for members who regularly make communications with amateur radio operators in other countries.  SARTS is the member society representing Singapore in the International Amateur Radio Union.

See also 
Malaysian Amateur Radio Transmitters' Society

References 

Singapore
Clubs and societies in Singapore
Radio in Singapore